The Economically Handicapped (Spanish: Los económicamente débiles) is a 1960 Spanish comedy film directed by Pedro Lazaga and starring Tony Leblanc, Laura Valenzuela and Antonio Ozores.

Cast
 Tony Leblanc as José Martín Rodríguez  
 Laura Valenzuela as Ana Molina García  
 Antonio Ozores as Paco Molina García  
 José Luis López Vázquez as Javier  
 Maruja Bustos as Nuria Molina García  
 Venancio Muro as Timoteo  
 Julio Riscal as Pichurri  
 Mayrata O'Wisiedo 
 Santiago Ríos 
 Jesús Puente as Examinador Escuela de Entrenadores  
 Juan Cazalilla 
 Ena Sedeño 
 Francisco Bernal 
 Charito Trallero 
 Francisco Vázquez 
 Margarita Gil 
 Fernando Sánchez Polack 
 Francisco Pierrá
 José Villasante
 Beni Deus 
 Enrique Collar as himself  
 Antonio Martínez 
 Emilio Rodríguez
 Carlos Martínez Campos 
 Guillermo Hidalgo 
 Joaquín Pamplona 
 Rafael Hernández as Fan del Cantalazo  
 Goyo Lebrero 
 
 Jaime Mayuca 
 Calero Parra 
 Antonio Delgado 
 José Luis Ayuso
 Rosa Cadenas 
 Felixin Yuste
 Rafael Cortés
 Conchita Gil 
 Pedro Antonio Jiménez
 Santiago Kuo 
 Otilia Escudero 
 Urrutia   
 Francisco Castillo 
 Mary Escudero 
 Antonio Martín 
 Serafín García Vázquez 
 Mari Carmen Alarcón
 Juan Ignacio Galván 
 Enrique Núñez 
 María Becedas
 Isidro Torres 
 Marisa Paredes 
 Fernando Salas 
 Eugenio Dicente 
 Rosa Navarro 
 Antonio Linares 
 José Rodríguez Rey 
 Irene Villamor 
 Aresi  
 Carlos Chamelar 
 Maruja Navajas 
 Alfredo Taular 
 F. Pérez Vázquez  
 Elisa Méndez 
 Gonzalo Zamora 
 Angelines Beoni 
 José María Lado 
 Elva de Bethancourt

References

Bibliography 
 Bentley, Bernard. A Companion to Spanish Cinema. Boydell & Brewer, 2008.

External links 
 

1960 comedy films
Spanish comedy films
1960 films
1960s Spanish-language films
Films directed by Pedro Lazaga
Films produced by Ricardo Sanz
1960s Spanish films